Emilio Luigi Carlo Giuseppe Maria Ghione (30 July 1879 – 7 January 1930), known as Emilio Ghione, was an Italian silent film actor, director and screenwriter. Ghione was best known for writing, directing, and starring in the Za La Mort series of adventure films, in which Ghione played a likeable French Apache and 'honest outlaw'. Ghione directed, wrote, and acted in every genre of film, and directed some of the most famous stars of the time, including Francesca Bertini, Lina Cavalieri, Alberto Collo, and Hesperia. After his final film role in 1926, Ghione briefly performed on a theatrical tour of Italy. Ghione wrote three novels based around his Za La Mort character, an autobiography, and an essay on Italian Silent Cinema, before his death from tuberculosis in 1930.

In 1979, a retrospective of Ghione's films was held at the Venice Film Festival. In 2008, a retrospective of his films was held at the Cinema Ritrovato festival in Bologna, and a temporary exhibition of photographs and film stills documenting Ghione's career was opened at the Cineteca of Bologna.

Film career

Early life and film career

Born in Turin, Emilio Ghione was the son of a minor painter, Celestino Ghione, and initially worked as a painter of miniatures.

Ghione secured work in Turin's growing film industry in 1908, initially as a set-hand and stuntman, performing dangerous stunts involving falling from horses. He began to play secondary roles in a variety of films, including the comedies of André Deed. Frustrated by the slow progress of his career, Ghione left Turin in 1911 to seek his fortune in Rome.

Rise to fame

In Rome, Ghione quickly progressed to starring roles in films made by Cines and Celio-Film, such as Il poverello di assisi (St Francis on its British release). Ghione then starred in a series of films alongside Francesca Bertini and Alberto Collo, including Histoire d'un Pierrot. Ghione directed his first film as actor-director, Il Circolo Nero, in 1913. Ghione became known for his success in directing the demanding divas of the period, including Lina Cavalieri, Francesca Bertini and Hesperia. However, Ghione was not entirely able to resist their demands - Francesca Bertini allegedly ordered the destruction of all the prints of Don Pietro Caruso because she did not like the outfits she wore in the film.

Za La Mort and height of fame

In 1914, Ghione created the first film featuring his character Za La Mort, Nelly La Gigolette, which was a great success. Following this success and his move to Tiber film, Ghione created a sequel called Za La Mort (1915), which developed the character and introduced a companion, Za La Vie, played by Kally Sambucini. Ghione created a total of thirteen Za La Mort feature films and three serial films between 1914 and 1924, many of which were very successful commercially. The character of Za La Mort, a Parisian apache, was unstable throughout the series. In some films, Za La Mort was a cruel-hearted, murderous, seductive criminal, while in others he was a romantic, faithful, underworld avenger, similar to Louis Feuillade's Judex. The Za La Mort series was mostly set in an imaginary Paris, with some episodes set in America and exotic tropical locations. Despite inconsistencies of plot and character and mostly negative critical reviews, Za La Morts exotic, exciting adventures captured the public imagination and Ghione became one of the most recognisable stars of the Italian silent cinema. During the production of the Za La Mort series, Ghione continued to star in and direct a variety of films, including melodramas, adventure films and a biopic of Italian patriot Guglielmo Oberdan.

Decline of film career and appearances in theatre

In the period 1919-1924, Ghione directed and starred in films for most of the major Italian film companies (including Lombardo (now known as Titanus) and other minor film companies. Ghione's decadent lifestyle and expensive habits left him nearly penniless when the Italian film industry collapsed in 1922. In 1923, he left for Germany to make Zalamort – Der Traum der Zalavie with Fern Andra, but the film was a commercial failure, owing partially to the fact that it was extensively cut by the censors.

Eventually, Ghione's own lack of funds and the commercial failure of several projects meant that he was no longer able to get the investment necessary to make his own film projects. Senza Padre (1924) was his last film as screenwriter, director and actor, and Ghione abandoned his last film project as a director, La Casa Errante, in 1927.

Ghione then acted in several of the 'all-star' productions of 1925-1926, which failed to revive the dying Italian film industry.

In 1926, Ghione launched a theatrical revue with Kally Sambucini and Alberto Collo and toured Italy performing sketches based on the Za La Mort films.

Career as an author

In 1922, Ghione's first Za La Mort novel, Le Maschere Bianche, was published in installments in the popular Al Cinema magazine.

Ghione's second novel, Za La Mort, was published in 1928. The novel was largely based on the Za La Mort films, especially on Zalamort – Der Traum der Zalavie, the plot of which had been made almost unintelligible by censorship cuts. Ghione's autobiography, Memorie e Confessioni also appeared in the monthly cinema magazine Cinemalia between March and December 1928.

During his time in Paris in 1929, Ghione wrote an essay on the history of Italian silent cinema La Parabole du Cinéma Italien (The Parabola of Italian Cinema). This essay was the first look at Italian silent cinema as a whole and was quoted extensively by the first film historians to deal with Italian silent cinema, such as Eugenio Palmieri. The essay was published in the French L'Art Cinematographique series in 1930 and in the Barcelona newspaper La Vanguardia in 1931.

In 1930, another Za La Mort novel was published called L'Ombra di Za La Mort. The novel's central character is Ghione/Za La Mort, a mix of Ghione's decadent star persona and his favourite character, and tells of his adventures across the world and his encounters with beautiful women. The novel features extracts from Ghione's autobiography Memorie e Confessioni and minimises the character of Kally Sambucini/Za La Vie.

Personal life

In 1911, Ghione married Clotilde Coletti and they had one son, Pierfrancesco Ghione, also known as Emilio Ghione Jr. The couple separated after 1913.

In 1915, Ghione started a relationship with Kally Sambucini, which lasted until his death.

Ghione led a famously decadent life, following the trends set by poet Gabriele D'Annunzio. Ghione spent a lot of money on restaurants, generous tips, clothes and antiques. Ghione was a fan of luxury automobiles made by Lancia and used them in his films.

Illness and death

Emilio Ghione was hospitalised following tuberculosis in 1927. A public appeal was opened for Ghione, and the money was used to help his recovery and send him to Paris in search of work. During his stay in Paris in 1929, Ghione slept rough and his health deteriorated. He was hospitalised in Paris and Lina Cavalieri paid to send him back to Turin by train.

Emilio Ghione died on 7 January 1930 in Rome, in the presence of Kally Sambucini and his son, Pierfrancesco Ghione. His funeral was held at the Roman Basilica of Santa Maria degli Angeli e dei Martiri, and his remains interred in the Verano cemetery in Rome.

Selected filmography

Films as actor and director

 Il Circolo Nero (1913)
 Don Pietro Caruso (1914)
 Nelly La Gigolette (1914)
 Za La Mort (1915)
 Oberdan (1915)
 Anime Buie (1916)
 Il Triangolo Giallo (1917)
 I Topi Grigi (1918)
 Sua Eccellenza La Morte (1919)
 Dollari e Fracks (1919)
 Il castello di bronzo (1920)
 Senza pietà (1921)
 Quale dei due (1922), also known as Za La Mort contro Za La Mort
 La maga e il grifo (1922)
 Latest Night News (1924)
  Za La Mort (1924), known in Italy as L'incubo di Zalavie
 Senza Padre (1926)

Films as actor
 Come fu che l'ingordigia rovinò il Natale a Cretinetti (1910)
 La Gerusalemme Liberata (1911)
 Broken Idol (1913)
 Pierrot the Prodigal (1913)
 Il Potere Sovrano (1916)
 The Fiery Cavalcade (1925)
 The Last Days of Pompeii (1926)

Films as director
Sposa nella morte! (1915) starring Lina Cavalieri
La rosa di granata (1916), starring Lina Cavalieri

References

Bibliography

1879 births
1930 deaths
Film people from Turin
20th-century Italian male actors
20th-century Italian novelists
20th-century Italian male writers
Italian male silent film actors
Italian film directors
20th-century deaths from tuberculosis
Tuberculosis deaths in Italy
Italian stunt performers
Infectious disease deaths in Lazio
Actors from Turin